Phiala sabalina is a moth in the family Eupterotidae. It was described by Rebel in 1914. It is found in the Democratic Republic of Congo (South Kivu).

References

Moths described in 1914
Eupterotinae